"Above It All" is a song by Canadian-American rock supergroup Saint Asonia. It was released on May 6, 2022 as the lead single from the EP Introvert. The song was written by members of the band and Bill Watkins and was produced by Anton DeLost.

Background
On April 19, 2022, the band teased the song on their Twitter account with an image taken from the music video, along with the lyrics "We've been drowning for far too long." The song is about rising above chaos, negativity, judgment and living the life you want to and not the life that is expected by others. Lead singer Adam Gontier wrote the song during the first lockdown in Canada after COVID hit. Gontier states:

Along with the songs release, the band announced the Introvert EP that would be released on July 1, 2022.

Music video
The video for "Above It All" premiered via YouTube on May 6, 2022 and was directed by Justin Reich.

Credits and personnel
Credits for "Above It All" adapted from AllMusic.

Saint Asonia
Adam Gontier – lead vocals
Cale Gontier – bass guitar
Mike Mushok – guitar
Cody Watkins – drums

Production
Anton Delost – mixing, producer
Ted Jensen – mastering engineer

Charts

Release history

References

2022 songs
2022 singles
Songs written by Adam Gontier
Saint Asonia songs